Dracula Reborn is a 2012 vampire-themed direct-to-video horror film, directed and written by Patrick McManus, making his feature film directorial debut. Produced by Ray Haboush, the film stars Corey Landis, Victoria Summer, Krash Miller, Stuart Rigby and Keith Reay. It is a modernized, loosely based take on Bram Stoker's 1897 novel Dracula, taking place in Los Angeles, California, where a wealthy Count Dracula looks to purchase an abandoned building and pursue the wife of his realtor, Jonathan Harker.

Plot

In Los Angeles, California, realtor Jonathan Harker proposes the sale of an abandoned building in a gang-dominated neighborhood for $12.5 million to his wealthy client Vladimir Sarkany - who is actually the vampire Count Dracula. The sale make Jonathan enough money to start a family with his wife, Lina. The night that Jonathan visits Dracula at his home to have the property deed signed, he notices a painted picture reminiscent of Lina. Later, Quincy Morris warns him about Dracula, who murdered his girlfriend, Lucy Spencer.

Police detectives, Holmwood and Varna investigate Lucy's disappearance. Dracula's associate, Renfield, frames Quincy for her murder. Jonathan takes Lina to see the painting at Dracula's home, where Dracula begins to hypnotically seduce Lina, who reminds him of woman on the painting. Jonathan and Lina head back home, but their car breaks down on the way, causing them to camp in the woods. During the night, Dracula seduces the detectives and goes to bite Lina, sparking her illness. At dawn, the car is able to start back up and Jonathan takes Lina to get blood work done by Dr. Joan Seward (Dani Lennon).

The following day, the detectives discover Lucy's corpse in a trunk. Jonathan finds out Lina is infected with an anonymous organism that is multiplying inside her system. While on the run, Quincy pleas to Jonathan for help to kill Dracula, although Jonathan refuses to believe Dracula is a vampire. Shortly after, Renfield runs Quincy over with a truck, killing him. When Lina begins feasting on their dog's corpse, Jonathan gets in contact with vampire hunter, Van Helsing for help and learns Quincy was killed. After Dracula seduces Lina and takes her away, Jonathan learns from Van Helsing and a mythical book that they have one day to rescue Lina and kill Dracula, or Lina will turn into a vampire. Jonathan confronts Dracula at his house, but Dracula wards him off. Jonathan hallucinates that he sees Lina on the road and crashes his car, but survives.

The next day, the detectives come to arrest Jonathan for his wife’s murder, and Van Helsing kills them. Jonathan and Van Helsing confront Dracula at his new house, which is about to go into closure. They find Dracula resting inside a coffin, and Van Helsing tries to kill him while Jonathan takes Lina upstairs. Dracula escapes and kills Van Helsing. He suddenly appears in front of Jonathan and attacks him; however, Jonathan and Lina kill him by driving a stake through his heart. Afterwards, Lina bites and presumably kills Jonathan, revealing she has become a vampire. Lina takes over Dracula's home, with Renfield as her assistant.

Cast

Corey Landis as Jonathan Harker
Victoria Summer as Lina Harker
Krash Miller as Quincy Morris 
Stuart Rigby as Vladimir Sakarny/Count Dracula 
Ian Pfister as Renfield
Keith Reay as Van Helsing
Preston James Hillier as Detective Holmwood
Linda Bella as Lucy Spencer
Amy Johnston as Vampire Lucy 
Charlie Garcia as Detective Varna
Dani Lennon as Dr. Joan Seward
Rene Arreola as Bandana Vato
Haref Topete as Gangbanger 
Patrick F. McCallum as Trigger 
Sharlene Brown as Harker's Assistant  
Christianna Carmine as Petra Hawkings

Release

The film was released by Phase 4 Films in North America and by other outlets in the United Kingdom on Video on Demand and DVD on October 1, 2012 and March 26, 2013.

Reception
Dracula Reborn was greeted with mixed to negative reviews. Dave Gammon of HorrorNews.net credited Patrick McManus for being "brash" to have created a new vampire tale in an over-saturated genre. He praises the cinematography and performances, particularly Ian Pfister’s portrayal of Renfield, but ultimately criticized the film for leaving “little to the imagination” and claimed it “arguably never should have been conceived”. Gammon gave the film a 2 out of 5.

References

External links
 
  

2012 films
2012 horror films
American supernatural horror films
Films shot in California
Dracula films
Direct-to-video horror films
2010s English-language films
2010s American films